Marcelo Benítez is the name of two footballers:

 Marcelo Benítez (footballer, born 1989), Argentine footballer
 Marcelo Benítez (footballer, born 1991), Argentine footballer